Hans Bernhard "Berny" Schlegel  (born September 24, 1951) is German-born computational and theoretical chemist,  and distinguished professor at Wayne State University. He is a highly cited chemist, with a Thomson Reuters H-Index of 116 and citations of over 218,000 as of 2020. He is a professor of chemistry at the Wayne State University and co-author of the computational chemistry software, Gaussian. The "Berny optimization" as implemented in Gaussian is named after him. His group also created the Electronic Structure Perl Toolkit (ESPT).

Schlegel was born in Frankfurt am Main, and immigrated to Canada with his family at the age of four. He was raised in Windsor, Ontario, and graduated from the University of Waterloo in 1972. Between 1978 and 1980, Schlegel was employed at Merck, Sharp, and Dohme Research Laboratories. Subsequently, Schlegel began his academic career at Wayne State as an assistant professor. He became a full professor in 1986, and a distinguished professor in 2011.

Schlegel has won the ACS Award for Computers in Chemical and Pharmaceutical Research and he is a Fellow of the American Association for the Advancement of Science, Fellow of the Royal Society of Chemistry, Fellow of the American Chemical Society and Academy of Scholars of Wayne State University, among others.

He has co-authored more than 400 peer-reviewed publications.
His most cited papers are:
 Gonzalez, H Bernhard Schlegel (1989) "An improved algorithm for reaction path following" The Journal of Chemical Physics, 94(4), 2154-2161  According to  Google Scholar, it has been cited 5382 times.
C Gonzalez, HB Schlegel  (1990) "Reaction path following in mass-weighted internal coordinates (1990)," Journal of Physical Chemistry 94 (14), 5523-5527 According to Google Scholar, this article has been cited 5327  times. 
HB Schlegel "Optimization of equilibrium geometries and transition structures" Journal of Computational Chemistry 3 (2), 214-218

Awards and fellowships

1.Alfred P. Sloan Fellowship (1981–83)

2.Camille and Henry Dreyfus Teacher Scholar (1984–89)

3.Academy of Scholars of Wayne State University (2001)

4.Fellow of the American Association for the Advancement of Science (2009)

5.Fellow of the Royal Society of Chemistry (2009)

6.Fellow of the American Chemical Society (2011)

7.ACS Award for Computers in  Chemical and Pharmaceutical Research(2013)

See also

 List of German Canadians

References 

Wayne State University faculty
Fellows of the Royal Society of Chemistry
Fellows of the American Chemical Society
Fellows of the American Association for the Advancement of Science
German emigrants to Canada
Scientists from Frankfurt
Sloan Fellows
1951 births
Living people
Members of the International Academy of Quantum Molecular Science
20th-century chemists
21st-century chemists